The History of Surat dates back hundreds of years. The city was founded in the late medieval period, and gradually became an important port in the Mughal Empire. The Maratha rulers defeated the Mughals during the Battle of Surat. Later, the Dutch ruled the area and the city became known as Dutch Suratte.

Early history

In the 12th and 15th centuries, Surat was plundered by Muslims. In 1512, and again in 1530, Surat was ravaged by the Portuguese Empire. In 1514, the Portuguese traveler Duarte Barbosa described Surat as an important seaport, frequented by many ships from Malabar and various parts of the world.

Around the turn of the sixteenth century, Malik Gopi, a Brahmin merchant, settled in Surat and the development of the city has been attributed to his contributions. Notably, Gopi built an artificial lake, the Gopi Talav, for water storage in 1516. The area he developed was called Gopipura, in his honour and the king of Gujarat gave him the title of "Malik". The town that he developed was still unnamed and consulting astrologers he proposed to name it "Suraj" or "Suryapur". By 1520, the name of the city had become Surat as the king, disliking the Hindu inclination of the name, altered it to "Surat" (meaning headings of the chapters of the Quran).  Gopi also finds mentions in Portuguese literature as "Lord of Surat and Bharuch".

In 1573, Surat was conquered by the Mughals. It was the most prosperous port in the Mughal empire, used for travel to the Hajj pilgrimage. Despite being a rich city, Surat looked like a typical "grubby" trader's town with mud-and-bamboo tenements and crooked streets, although along the riverfront there were a few mansions and warehouses belonging to local merchant princes and the establishments of Turkish, Armenian, English, French and Dutch traders. There were also hospitals for cows, horses, flies and insects run by religious Jains, which puzzled travelers. Some streets were narrow while others were of sufficient width. In the evening, especially near the Bazaar (marketplace), the streets became crowded with people and merchants (including Banyan merchants) selling their goods. Surat was a populous city during the Mughal era but also had a large transient population: during the monsoon season, when ships could come and go from the ports without danger, the city's population would swell. In 1612, England established its first Indian trading factory in Surat. The city was sacked twice by the Maratha king Shivaji, with the first sacking occurring in 1664. Shivaji's raids scared trade away and caused ruin to the city.

Colonial period

Later, Surat became the emporium of India, exporting gold and cloth. Its major industries were shipbuilding and textile manufacture. The coast of the Tapti River, from Athwalines to Dumas, was specially meant for shipbuilders, who were usually Rassis. The city continued to be prosperous until the rise of Bombay (present-day Mumbai). Afterwards, Surat's shipbuilding industry declined and Surat itself gradually declined throughout the 18th century. Between 1790–91, an epidemic killed 100,000 Gujaratis in Surat. The British and Dutch both claimed control of the city, but in 1800, the British took control of Surat. The Andrews Library was built during this period.

In the great fire of 1837, more than 500 people died and caused the destruction of 9737 houses. It was the most destructive fire in the history of city.

By the middle of the 19th century, Surat had become a stagnant city with about 80,000 inhabitants. When India's railways opened, the city started becoming prosperous again. Silks, cottons, brocades, and objects of gold and silver from Surat became famous and the ancient art of manufacturing fine muslin was revived.

Post-Independence
After Indian independence in 1947, several educational institutions including the NIT Surat and Veer Narmad South Gujarat University

References 

 
Surat